Krzysztof Kowalewski (20 March 1937 – 6 February 2021) was a Polish actor and comedian.

Biography
Kowalewski was born to a Jewish mother, actress Elżbieta Herszaft-Kowalewska and Polish father, Cyprian Kowalewski, who was a soldier.

His first wife, Vivian, was from Cuba. For many years, he was in a relationship with actress Ewa Wiśniewska. They split up after Krzysztof met actress Agnieszka Suchora, whom he married in 2002. He had two children: Wiktor (from his relationship with Vivian) and Gabriela (with Agnieszka Suchora).

Kowalewski was awarded a Grand Splendor Prize (Wielki Splendor) in 1992, the Knight's Cross of the Order of Polonia Restituta in 2002, and a Medal for Merit to Culture – Gloria Artis the same year.

Selected filmography

Film

Television

References

External links

 

1937 births
2021 deaths
Polish male film actors
Polish people of Jewish descent
Polish comedians
Knights of the Order of Polonia Restituta
Recipients of the Gold Medal for Merit to Culture – Gloria Artis
Polish male stage actors
Polish male television actors
Polish male voice actors
Aleksander Zelwerowicz National Academy of Dramatic Art in Warsaw alumni
Burials at Powązki Cemetery
Male actors from Warsaw